Indian alchemy may refer to:

Rasayana
History of metallurgy in the Indian subcontinent

See also
A History of Hindu Chemistry, a two-volume book by Prafulla Chandra Ray published in 1902 and 1909